Inveresk railway station served the village of Inveresk, Midlothian (now East Lothian), Scotland from 1846 to 1964 on the East Coast Main Line.

History
The station was opened on 22 June 1846 by the North British Railway as Musselburgh. On 16 July 1847, the name was changed to Inveresk. The station was situated to the west of the current Wallyford railway station and to the east of the current Musselburgh railway station. Its name was changed to Inveresk Junction on 1 October 1876 but changed back to Inveresk on 2 June 1890. The passenger station closed on 4 May 1964 and the last goods service ran on 8 May 1970, thus the station closed completely the day after.

References

External links

1846 establishments in Scotland
Railway stations in Great Britain opened in 1846
Railway stations in Great Britain closed in 1964
Former North British Railway stations
Beeching closures in Scotland
1970 disestablishments in Scotland
Disused railway stations in East Lothian